Dariusz Drągowski (born 3 November 1970) is a Polish former professional footballer who played as a midfielder. He is the father of Bartłomiej Drągowski. 

He graduated from the Mechanical School in Białystok. He is the product of the local Jagiellonia's youth system, and won the national junior championship in 1988 under Jerzy Brzęczek. He debuted in the senior team the same year, and stayed until 1995, amassing 88 caps of which 12 in the top division.

He then played for Siarka Tarnobrzeg, with 21 top division caps in the 1995/96 season. having stayed another season after relegation, in 1997 he returned to Białystok to play for Hetman. He was loaned out to Wigry Suwałki in 2000, before retiring in 2002.
After retirement he became a customs officer.

References

1970 births
Living people
Sportspeople from Białystok
People from Białystok
Polish footballers
Association football midfielders